The Beth Jacob Social Hall and Congregation (also known as the Beth Jacob Synagogue) was the first synagogue in Miami Beach, Florida. It is located at 301 and 311 Washington Avenue.  The building at 311 was built in 1929 and designed by H Fraser Rose.  The building at 301 was built in 1936 and was designed by Henry Hohauser.  On October 16, 1980, it was added to the U.S. National Register of Historic Places. It is no longer a synagogue, but houses the Jewish Museum of Florida.

References

External links

Jewish Museum of Florida

National Register of Historic Places in Miami-Dade County, Florida
Synagogues in Miami Beach, Florida
Art Deco synagogues
Art Deco architecture in Florida
Synagogues completed in 1928
Synagogues on the National Register of Historic Places in Florida
1928 establishments in Florida
Museums in Miami-Dade County, Florida
Jewish museums in Florida
Former synagogues in Florida